The TREMEC TR-3450 is a 5-speed manual transmission for longitudinal engine rear wheel drive trucks.  It includes one overdrive gear, a light-weight aluminum housing, multi-cone synchronizers on first and second gear, and a synchromesh reverse gear.  It is manufactured by Transmission Technologies Corporation.

Applications
 Chevrolet Silverado C1500 and C2500
 Dodge Ram 1500 and 2000

External links
 Official page

3450